Brother Sun, Sister Moon may refer to:

 Brother Sun, Sister Moon, biographical movie of St. Francis of Assisi
 Brother Sun, Sister Moon (album), soundtrack of the movie.
 Brother Sun Sister Moon (musical duo), a musical duo of Paul Robb and Barbara Cohen